"Se tu della mia morte" ("Wouldst thou the boast of ending") is an aria in G minor from act 3 of Alessandro Scarlatti's 1697 opera La caduta de' decemviri (The fall of the decemviri) to a libretto by Silvio Stampiglia.

The da capo aria is accompanied only by a basso continuo. Its time signature is 12/8 to a tempo of andante and it is 24 bars long. The vocal range for a castrato soprano is from D4 to F5.

The aria gained popularity as a concert aria when it appeared in 1886 in the collection  by Alessandro Parisotti, published by Casa Ricordi in Milan.

Lyrics
Appio Claudio has just attempted suicide, but Valeria, who loves him despite his rejection, has prevented it. "If I cannot die by my own hand, may your eyes kill me."

References

External links
 
 English translation, recmusic.org
 Alessandro Scarlatti: "Se tu della mia morte", details
 , Sonia Theodoridou

Compositions by Alessandro Scarlatti
1697 compositions
Compositions in G minor
Arias in Italian
Soprano arias